The Beaufort Gyre is one of the two major ocean currents in the Arctic Ocean. It is roughly located north of the Alaskan and Canadian coast. In the past, Arctic sea-ice would circulate in the Beaufort gyre up to several years, leading to the formation of very thick multi-year sea-ice. Due to warming temperatures in the Arctic, the gyre has lost an extensive amount of ice, practically turning what used to be a nursery for sea-ice to mature and grow into the thickest and oldest ice of the Arctic Ocean into a "graveyard" for older ice.

Dynamical mechanisms
Conditions in the Arctic have favored sea ice loss in recent years during the Northern Hemisphere summers. At the end of the 20th century, analyses of increasing Pacific Surface Water temperatures led to the discovery of a connection between these rising temperatures and the onset of severe loss of Arctic sea ice in the Beaufort Sea. A reason for the existence of this link was proposed: "...delayed winter ice formation allows for more efficient coupling between the ocean and wind forcing." These dynamical mechanisms are observed in the spin-up and circulation of the Beaufort Gyre.

Housed in the western part of the Arctic Ocean is the Beaufort Gyre, whose growing reservoir of freshwater is shrouded in mystery. In recent years, this increasing freshwater content (FWC) has been the focal point of many studies, particularly those concerning coupled ocean-atmosphere dynamics. The majority of the Arctic’s freshwater content resides in the Beaufort Gyre. Although biased toward the Northern Hemisphere summer months, observations from submarines, ships, and stations on drifting ice suggest that the gyre has been expanding over the past two decades. Researchers have employed coupled sea-ice-ocean general circulation models in order to thoroughly analyze these observations. Model results show that Ekman transport plays an integral role in the variability of freshwater in the gyre, and thus in the Arctic Ocean. The prevailing rotational direction of the Beaufort Gyre is clockwise, following the prevailing wind circulation of the Polar High.  Coriolis veers moving objects to the right in the northern hemisphere and "to the right" is inwards in a clockwise rotating system.  This is why anything floating, including fresher water, tends to move toward the centre of the system.  Indeed, there is a slight bulge in the centre of the Beaufort gyre when it is rotating in its predominant clockwise direction.  If, as is speculated, as the Arctic Ocean becomes a heat collector resulting in a low pressure, counter clockwise rotating system, the Beaufort Gyre can be expected to follow suit and send the fresher water outward to be captured by the transpolar current.  This could well bring up the saltier, slightly warmer Atlantic water which lies under the floating, fresher Arctic water.

Variations in the Ekman transport change the sea surface height and depth of the halocline, resulting in Ekman pumping. During anticyclonic regimes—where the wind stress curl is negative—freshwater is pumped into the Beaufort Gyre; during cyclonic regimes—where wind stress curl is positive—freshwater is released into the Arctic Ocean, where it can then flow into the North Atlantic. Giles et al. (2012) conclude that the variability in freshwater content varies with wind stress curl. The wind stress curl used by Giles et al. (2012) is from the NCEP/NCAR Reanalysis data at the National Oceanic & Atmospheric Administration, Earth System Research Laboratory, Physical Sciences Division (NOAA/OAR/ESRL PSD) in Boulder, Colorado, USA.

The seasonal cycle of freshwater content does not only concern mechanical (Ekman pumping) processes, but thermal (ice formation) processes as well. During the June–July months, the mean seasonal cycle of freshwater content peaks; in this season, sea ice thickness reaches a minimum, implying that the amount of melted sea ice has reached a maximum. The maximum in freshwater content released into the ocean waters coincides with a maximum in wind stress curl (i.e., a minimum in Ekman pumping), allowing for a high volume of freshwater to seep into the Arctic Ocean circulation. This rapid influx of freshwater into the Arctic circulation forces a large volume of freshwater to outflow into the North Atlantic basin, affecting the Atlantic Meridional Overturning Circulation.

Studies
The freshwater within this gyre represents about 10% of all the freshwater in the Arctic Ocean; the majority of the Arctic's freshwater supply originates from Russian rivers as runoff. The clockwise circulation of the Beaufort Gyre is induced by the wind patterns associated with the permanent anticyclonic high pressure system over the western part of the Arctic. In a clockwise-rotating gyre in the Northern Hemisphere, the Coriolis force causes the ocean water to flow inward toward the gyre's center where it accumulates, effectively forming a dome of water. If the wind patterns shift into a cyclonic circulation due to the residence of a low pressure system (rising air induced by warmer ocean temperatures a greater volume of open Arctic Ocean water), this will cause the circulation of the Beaufort Gyre to reverse and flow counter-clockwise. If this occurs, the Coriolis force would bend the flow out and away from the center of the gyre and, instead of the formation of a rising water dome, a depression would form and upwelling of the warmer water from the Atlantic ocean would occur.

Oceanographer Andrey Proshutinsky has theorized that if the winds and the gyre's circulation were to weaken, high volumes of freshwater could leak out of the eastern part of the Arctic Ocean into the Northern Atlantic Ocean, impacting the Thermohaline Circulation and thus climate.

Due to seasonal sea ice formation, the Beaufort Gyre is difficult to access and thus study in the Northern Hemisphere winter months; the lack of sunlight in these months forces the use of artificial light.  Studies by Arthur S. Dyke and others show that if the volume of outflow of rivers into the Beaufort Gyre increase, the gyre itself might spatially shift toward the right.

See also
Eddy (fluid dynamics)
Flaw lead
Francis Beaufort and the Beaufort Sea
Transpolar Drift Stream

References

External links
The Beaufort Gyre Exploration Project from the Woods Hole Oceanographic Institution
Animation: Disappearing Arctic sea ice from NASA Climate change: Vital signs of the planet

Currents of the Arctic Ocean
Oceanic gyres

de:Eisdrift#Eisdrift in der Arktis